The Princess Theatre, located at 29–33 Market Street, Fremantle, Australia, was built in 1912. It closed in 1969 and is now used for offices and retail businesses.

History
The theatre was built on the site of an old warehouse that was demolished. It was purpose built 1912 for Captain Frank Biddles (1851–1932) (a master pearler from Broome, who had semi-retired to Fremantle in 1902). It was designed by a local architect, John McNeece, and built by Mr C. Moore, at a cost of £22,000. The theatre, with a seating capacity of 1,850, was opened on 21 December 1912 by the Mayor of Fremantle, Frederick James McLaren. The opening night included a screening of The French Spy and vaudeville performances by Miss Elsie McGuire. Until 1914 the theatre was managed by Thomas Coombe. Coombe then lost contact with the building as the management changed as a new cinema opened but he returned in 1917 to take over the business.

In 1915, Captain Biddles made the basement of the Princess Theatre available to provide amenities for army and naval personnel. This was the early beginnings of the RSA, later to become known as the Returned and Services League of Australia (RSL). A more permanent structure was built the following year nearby.

The building was extensively reconstructed in 1941 and the auditorium lost its original 1912 décor. On 26 June 1969, the Princess Theatre closed, and the building was converted to commercial uses.

The building was classified by the National Trust of Australia in May 1974 and placed on the Register of National Estate in March 1978.

The ground floor is currently occupied by Kakulas Sister and a hairdressing salon. The upper floors are occupied by various small businesses including architecture firms PardoeDesign and Harris Design Group, developers Yolk, and short term creative co-working studio FSpace. The basement is not used as it is below sea level and flooded (if not pumped out).

See also
 List of heritage places in Fremantle

References

Fremantle West End Heritage area
Theatres completed in 1912
Theatres in Western Australia
Culture in Perth, Western Australia
Federation style architecture
Market Street, Fremantle
1912 establishments in Australia
State Register of Heritage Places in the City of Fremantle